Heterodera goettingiana, the pea cyst nematode, is a plant pathogenic nematode affecting pea found in the United kingdom.

See also 
 List of pea diseases
 Agriculture of the United Kingdom

References

External links 
 Nemaplex, University of California - Heterodera goettingiana 

goettingiana
Plant pathogenic nematodes
Pulse crop diseases
Nematodes described in 1892